Pyšel is a municipality and village in Třebíč District in the Vysočina Region of the Czech Republic. It has about 500 inhabitants.

Administrative parts
The village of Vaneč is an administrative part of Pyšel.

References

Villages in Třebíč District